Vakka-Suomi is a sub-region within the Southwest Finland region. It consists of the town of Uusikaupunki and its surrounding municipalities of Kustavi, Laitila, Mietoinen, Mynämäki, Pyhäranta, Taivassalo and Vehmaa. This sub-region is in name only, without official government. The composition of the area is disputable, as communities within it have been and are merged into each other, even into ones that are not seen to belong into Vakka-Suomi. For example, Kalanti and Lokalahti are no longer their own municipalities, but a part of Uusikaupunki.

The name of the region originates from the 19th century, when a significant export of the region was s. A  is a commonly a lightweight container made out of wood, generally carryable by two hands. A  usually has a flat bottom and a round shape. It has an easily fitting lid that has a locking mechanism and is commonly without hinges.

Sub-regions of Finland